Capoid race is a grouping formerly used for the Khoikhoi and San peoples in the context of a now-outdated model of dividing humanity into different races. The term was introduced by Carleton S. Coon in 1962 and named for the Cape of Good Hope. Coon proposed that the term "Negroid" should be abandoned, and the sub-Saharan African populations of West African stock (including the Bantu) should be termed "Congoid" instead.

The observation of a significant difference between the Khoisan and the populations of West African stock was not original to Coon. It had been noted as early as 1684 by François Bernier, the early modern author who originally introduced the French word race to refer to the large divisions of mankind. Bernier, outside of five large divisions described in more detail, proposed the possible addition of more categories, primarily for "the Blacks of the Cape of Good Hope" (les Noirs du Cap de bonne Esperance), which seemed to him to be of significantly different build from most other populations below the Sahara.

References

Historical definitions of race
Biological anthropology